Perivale is a London Underground station in Perivale in north-west London. It is located on the West Ruislip branch of the Central line, between Greenford and Hanger Lane stations, and is in Travelcard Zone 4.

History
The Great Western Railway (GWR) opened  on its New North Main Line (now the Acton–Northolt line) on 2 May 1904. The station was designed in 1938 by Brian Lewis, later the GWR's Chief Architect, but completion was delayed by the Second World War. The finished building was modified by the architect Frederick Francis Charles Curtis. A planned tower and extended wing were never built, leaving the station smaller than intended. In July 2011, the station was one of 16 London Underground stations that were given Grade II listed status.

Connections
London Buses route 297 serves the station.

TV appearances
The front of the station featured briefly in the first episode of the 2005 BBC series The Thick of It. It also appeared in the first episode of the 1994 BBC series The Fast Show, featuring John Thomson.

Gallery

References

Central line (London Underground) stations
Tube stations in the London Borough of Ealing
Railway stations in Great Britain opened in 1947
Grade II listed railway stations
Tube station
Grade II listed buildings in the London Borough of Ealing